The 2007 IFSC Climbing World Championships, the 9th edition, were held in Aviles, Spain from 17 to 23 September 2007. It was the first Climbing World Championships organized by the International Federation of Sport Climbing (IFSC).

Medal winners overview

Lead

Men 
115 athletes attended the men's lead competition.

Women 
68 athletes attended the women's lead competition. Angela Eiter and Muriel Sarkany topped all the routes in the qualification, semifinal, and final rounds which made them tied. So, they climbed one more time in the superfinal round where Angela Eiter took the win.

Bouldering

Men 
131 athletes attended the men's bouldering competition.

Women 
77 athletes attended the women's bouldering competition. Anna Stöhr flashed all boulders in the final round to take the win.

Speed

Men 
70 athletes competed in the men's speed climbing event.

Women 
39 athletes competed in the women's speed climbing event.

References 

IFSC Climbing World Championships
World Climbing Championships
International sports competitions hosted by Spain